Anna Christianovna Johansson (1860–1917), was a Russian Empire ballerina who danced with the St. Petersburg Imperial Ballet.

Life and career
Anna Johansson was the daughter of Christian Johansson, the noted Swedish choreographer, teacher and Balletmaster at the Russian Imperial Ballet. She studied ballet with her father and rose to a position as a noted soloist in the Imperial Ballet at the Maryinsky Theatre.

She created many of the most famous soloist roles in the Petipa/Ivanov repertoire. These roles include the following:

The Fairy Canari and the Diamond Fairy in The Sleeping Beauty (1890)
The leading soloist of the Waltz of the Flowers in The Nutcracker (1892)
The Fairy Godmother in Cinderella (1893)
Aurora, the Goddess of the Dawn in The Awakening of Flora (1894)
The Black Pearl in La Perle (1896)
The female variation of the Grand Pas Classique Hongrois in Raymonda (1898)

After retiring from the stage, following her father's footsteps, she became a celebrated teacher of the classe de perfectionnement at the Imperial Ballet School until her death in 1917.

References

1860 births
1917 deaths
Mariinsky Ballet dancers
Ballerinas from the Russian Empire

People from the Russian Empire of Swedish descent
19th-century ballet dancers from the Russian Empire